Gustave Moos (1905 – December 1948) was a Swiss cyclist. He competed in the team pursuit event at the 1928 Summer Olympics.

References

External links
 

1905 births
1948 deaths
Swiss male cyclists
Olympic cyclists of Switzerland
Cyclists at the 1928 Summer Olympics
Place of birth missing